Dmitry Faizullin (born February 18, 1991, USSR) is a Russian futsal player. He plays as a goalkeeper for the Moscow club Dina Moscow and the Russian national futsal team.

Biography
Faizullin has been playing in "Norilsk Nickel" since 2007, in the first team - since 2009. In the 2010/11 season he became the first goalkeeper in Norilsk.
In May 2010, the young goalkeeper was invited to play in the Russian national futsal team for an exhibition game against Japan. His debut in the national team took place in the second game. That year he also became a member of the Russian national team for the Student's World Championship. The national team won the silver medal, and Dmitri was voted the best goalkeeper of the tournament.

Achievements
 Russian Futsal Championship (1): 2014

External links
MFK Dina Moskva profile
AMFR profile

1981 births
Living people
Futsal goalkeepers
MFK Dina Moskva players
Russian men's futsal players
People from Norilsk